The Golden Opportunities 2 is a free  downloadable EP by indie rock band Okkervil River, containing the covers of five songs – the product of a one-day studio session, recorded onto a two track tape by Danny Reisch at Premium Recording in Austin, TX.  It was released as a free download from the band's website on November 28, 2011.  It is a sequel to their 2007 album, Golden Opportunities Mixtape.  After self-releasing the first part, Golden Opportunities 2 has been released with the backing of their label, Jagjaguwar.

Track listing

Notes

External links
Official website with downloadable album
Consequence of Sound link
Pitchfork link

2011 albums
Okkervil River albums